Richmond Heights is a city in St. Louis County, Missouri. It is an inner-ring suburb of St. Louis, Missouri, United States. The population was 8,603 at the 2010 census. According to Robert L. Ramsay, the name was suggested by Robert E. Lee, who thought the topography of the area resembled Richmond, Virginia.

Geography
Richmond Heights is located at  (38.628402, -90.328614).

Highways
Richmond Heights has several major highways within its boundaries: Interstate 170, Interstate 64 and U.S. Route 40.

Demographics

2020 census
As of 2020, there were 9,286 people and 4,149 households living in the city. The racial makeup of the city was 78.0% White, 8.7% African American, 0.1% Native American, 5.8% Asian, 1.0% from other races, and 6.3% from two or more races. Hispanic or Latino of any race were 4.0% of the population.

2010 census
As of the census of 2010, there were 8,603 people, 4,244 households, and 2,012 families living in the city. The racial makeup of the city was 81.7% White, 11.6% African American, 0.2% Native American, 4.2% Asian, 0.5% from other races, and 1.8% from two or more races. Hispanic or Latino of any race were 2.3% of the population.

There were 4,244 households, of which 20.9% had children under the age of 18 living with them, 35.8% were married couples living together, 8.4% had a female householder with no husband present, 3.3% had a male householder with no wife present, and 52.6% were non-families. 42.4% of all households were made up of individuals, and 10.4% had someone living alone who was 65 years of age or older. The average household size was 2.01 and the average family size was 2.84.

The median age in the city was 38.6 years. 18.2% of residents were under the age of 18; 7.9% were between the ages of 18 and 24; 32.8% were from 25 to 44; 27.7% were from 45 to 64; and 13.5% were 65 years of age or older. The gender makeup of the city was 46.8% male and 53.2% female.

2000 census
As of the census of 2000, there were 9,602 people, 4,647 households, and 2,202 families living in the city. The racial makeup of the city was 81.54% White, 13.32% African American, 0.25% Native American, 3.20% Asian, 0.01% Pacific Islander, 0.34% from other races, and 1.34% from two or more races. Hispanic or Latino of any race were 1.74% of the population.

In the city the population was spread out, with 19.2% under the age of 18, 9.0% from 18 to 24, 36.0% from 25 to 44, 21.0% from 45 to 64, and 14.7% who were 65 years of age or older. The median age was 36 years. For every 100 females, there were 85.6 males. For every 100 females age 18 and over, there were 80.1 males.

The median income for a household in the city was $50,557, and the median income for a family was $69,681. Males had a median income of $47,536 versus $35,407 for females. The per capita income for the city was $37,217. About 4.4% of families and 7.3% of the population were below the poverty line, including 8.3% of those under age 18 and 11.7% of those age 65 or over.

Economy
Panera Bread was formerly headquartered in Richmond Heights with a St. Louis Bread Co. bakery-cafe (as they are locally known) located across the street. The Sisters of Saint Mary hospital, a movie theater, various notable small businesses, specialty shops, and franchised business locations. The Saint Louis Galleria is a prominent shopping mall in the area, and a large source of municipal revenue. The Parkmoor restaurant was a local institution in neighboring Clayton that used to face Oak Knoll Park, also in Clayton right across from Richmond Heights on the north side of Clayton Road. It was demolished as part of a Walgreens drugstore expansion. The Clayton store has a Richmond Heights zip code.

Transportation

Public transportation 
Richmond Heights is served by the Blue Line of the St. Louis region's MetroLink light rail system. The city is served by the Richmond Heights station.

Major roads and highways 
Major arterial routes in Richmond Heights include Big Bend Boulevard, Brentwood Boulevard, Clayton Road, Eager Road, Hanley Road, and McKnight Road. Interstate 64 also passes through the city traveling east and west, while Interstate 170 enters from the north and ends at I-64 and Eager Road.

Education
Public education in Richmond Heights is administered by Maplewood-Richmond Heights School District.

Richmond Heights has a public library, the Richmond Heights Memorial Library.

See also
Evens & Howard Fire Brick Co., a specialty, high-temperature brick company in the city that established African American neighborhoods in Richmond Heights, despite racial segregation in St. Louis County at the time
Fitz's, root beer brand started in Richmond Heights
Hi-Pointe, St. Louis, adjoining St. Louis neighborhood
Immacolata School, Catholic primary school
St. Louis Modern Chinese School
Wydown/Skinker, St. Louis, narrow St. Louis neighborhood west of Forest Park and bordered on the south by Richmond Heights

References

External links
 City of Richmond Heights official website

Cities in St. Louis County, Missouri
Cities in Missouri